Godwinia is a genus of air-breathing land snails, terrestrial gastropod mollusks in the family Oxychilidae.

Godwinia is the type genus of the subfamily Godwiniinae.

Distribution
This genus is endemic to Hawaii.

Species
Species within the genus Godwinia include:
 Godwinia caperata (Gould, 1864)
 Godwinia haupuensis (C. M. Cooke, 1921)
 Godwinia newcombi (Reeve, 1854)

References

Oxychilidae
Gastropod genera